G. H. Raisoni Institute of Information Technology (Department of Biotechnology and Microbiology) (GHRIIT) is an educational institute located in Nagpur which is affiliated to the Rashtrasant Tukadoji Maharaj Nagpur University (RTMNU). It offers post-graduate degrees in the fields of Microbiology and Biotechnology and is part of the Raisoni Group of Institutions. It was established in 2000 and is approved by University Grants Commission, New Delhi.

Programs offered 
GHRIIT offers Postgraduate programs:

 Master of Biotechnology (Semester Pattern)
 Master of Microbiology (Semester Pattern)

References 
http://www.raisoni.net

Universities and colleges in Nagpur
Science and technology in Nagpur
Rashtrasant Tukadoji Maharaj Nagpur University
Educational institutions established in 2000
2000 establishments in Maharashtra